Tilson Pritchard (1872 – after 1894) was an English footballer who played in the Football League for Small Heath.

Pritchard was born in Walsall Wood, Staffordshire, and joined Small Heath from Burntwood Swifts in April 1894. Despite failing to impress in the United Counties League, a minor competition, he stood in for the injured Dowk Oliver in the First Division match away to Blackburn Rovers on 5 January 1895. Blackburn won 9–1, and Pritchard soon returned to non-league football with Lichfield Town.

References

1872 births
Year of death missing
People from Walsall Wood
Sportspeople from Walsall
English footballers
Association football fullbacks
Birmingham City F.C. players
English Football League players
Date of birth missing
Place of death missing